Královo Pole indoor arena was an indoor sporting arena located in Brno-Královo Pole, Brno, Czech Republic.  The capacity of the arena was 12,000 people. It opened in 1947 and closed in 2000. Prior to its closure, it served as the primary arena for HC Kometa Brno.

References 

Indoor ice hockey venues in the Czech Republic
Buildings and structures in Brno
Sport in Brno
1947 establishments in Czechoslovakia
2000 disestablishments in the Czech Republic
Sports venues completed in 1947
Sports venues demolished in 2008
Demolished buildings and structures in the Czech Republic
20th-century architecture in the Czech Republic